Patrick McHale VC (1826 – 26 October 1866) was born in Killala, County Mayo and was an Irish recipient of the Victoria Cross, the highest and most prestigious award for gallantry in the face of the enemy that can be awarded to British and Commonwealth forces.

Details
He was approximately 31 years old, and a private in the 1st Battalion, 5th Regiment of Foot (later The Northumberland Fusiliers) British Army, during the Siege of Lucknow and Second Battle of Cawnpore, turning points in the Indian Mutiny, when the following deeds took place for which he was awarded the VC:

Further information
He died at Shorncliff, Kent on 26 October 1866 and was buried at Shorncliffe Military Cemetery, near Folkestone, Kent, England. Section I – Upper Right. Headstone.

The medal

His Victoria Cross is displayed in the Fusiliers Museum of Northumberland at Alnwick Castle, Northumberland, England.

References

Listed in order of publication year 
The Register of the Victoria Cross (1981, 1988 and 1997)

Ireland's VCs  (Dept of Economic Development, 1995)
Monuments to Courage (David Harvey, 1999)
Irish Winners of the Victoria Cross (Richard Doherty & David Truesdale, 2000)

External links
Location of grave and VC medal (Kent)

1826 births
1866 deaths
19th-century Irish people
British Army recipients of the Victoria Cross
Indian Rebellion of 1857 recipients of the Victoria Cross
Irish recipients of the Victoria Cross
Irish soldiers in the British Army
Military personnel from County Mayo
Royal Northumberland Fusiliers soldiers